Playin' to Win is the fourth album by American southern rock band Outlaws, released in 1978. The album was their first studio project with guitarist/singer/songwriter Freddie Salem. Salem had replaced founding member/guitarist/singer/songwriter Henry Paul, who had acted as the second frontman behind Hughie Thomasson. It was not as well-received as their previous three albums. Notwithstanding, it still featured half of the original lineup, which would remain until the departure of guitarist Billy Jones in 1981.

Track listing
"Take It Any Way You Want It" (Billy Jones, Hughie Thomasson) – 3:15
"Cry Some More" (Jones, Thomasson) – 3:40
"You Are the Show" (Thomasson) – 4:56
"You Can Have It" (Harvey Dalton Arnold) – 3:04
"If Dreams Came True" (Jones, Robert John "Mutt" Lange) – 2:48
"A Real Good Feelin'" (Jones) – 4:30
"Love at First Sight" (Thomasson) – 2:45
"Falling Rain" (Freddie Salem) – 4:09
"Dirty City" (Iain Sutherland) – 5:27

Personnel
Billy Jones - electric guitar, vocals
Hughie Thomasson - acoustic, electric, and pedal steel guitars; banjo; vocals
Freddie Salem - electric guitar, slide guitar, vocals
Mike Duke - keyboards
Harvey Dalton Arnold - bass, guitar, vocals
David Dix - percussion, conga, drums
Monte Yoho - percussion, drums

Production
Producer: Robert John "Mutt" Lange
Engineer: Rodney Mills
Arranger: Robert John "Mutt" Lange
Art Direction: Ron Kellum
Design: Gerard Huerta, Ron Kellum
Photography: John Barrett

Charts
Album

Notes 

Outlaws (band) albums
1978 albums
Albums produced by Robert John "Mutt" Lange
Arista Records albums